Vladimir Petrovich Holstinin is a Russian guitarist. He is one of the founding members of heavy metal band Aria.

Biography 
Vladimir was born May 12, 1958, in Lyubertsy, Russian SFSR.  He graduated from Moscow Power Engineering Institute, where he met Vitaly Dubinin. The two institute mates became friends and formed a band Volshebnie Sumerki (Magic Twilight). The band played mostly cover versions of foreign bands' songs, such as Deep Purple and Rainbow.  Arthur Berkut was the band's vocalist, and Magic Twilight is often considered to be a prototype to Aria.

After Twilight's disband, Holstinin, together with bassist Alik Granovsky, joined rock band Alpha. Their participation was short-lived, and in 1984 they went to VIA Poyushchie Serdtsa (Singing Hearts) led by producer Victor Vekshtein. Joined by vocalist Valery Kipelov, they formed a heavy metal band Aria, officially registered as a "side project" to Singing Hearts. Aria soon developed to be much more popular than original Singing Hearts that played a common kind of Soviet pop-rock music.  After the breakup of original lineup, Holstinin and Kipelov kept the side of Vekshtein, who owned the band's name. Vladimir invited his friend and former bandmate Vitaly Dubinin to replace Granovsky on bass.

Currently, Holstinin remains the only founding member in actual lineup of Aria. Along with Dubinin, he is one of main composers of the band. Recently he produced some young metal bands; his most notable collaboration was the best-selling Elven Manuscript concept album by Epidemia.

Equipment
 Several Fender Stratocaster and a couple Telecasters
 Several Jackson, including some RRV.
 Some Gibson Les Paul
 Several Dean, including DIME Signature models.
 Several Hamer guitars.
 Hembry, Martin, Taylor, Jay Turser.
 MARSHALL JVM 410
 MARSHALL TSL 100
 DIEZEL Herbert
 MARSHALL 1960A cabinet 4х12 
 MARSHALL 1936 cabinet 2х12 
 BOSS MIDI Controller
 MXR Phase 90 
 MXR CAE Wah
 OVERDRIVE Энвера Чомаева (Envera Chomaeva) 
 TORTUGA Martini Chorus
 ISP Decimator Noise Reduction pedal
 SEYMOUR DUNCAN Deja Vu Tap Delay 
 JIM DUNLOP Talkbox
 KORG Pitch Black Tuner
 T-REX FuelTank Classic
 SHURE SM-57 Microphone
 DEAN MARKLEY Strings
 EVIDENCE AUDIO Cable

References

Literature
 Маргарита Пушкина, Дилан Трой, Виктор Троегубов. «Легенда о Динозавре» (1999)

External links
 
Worldelectricguitar.ru profile on Holstinin (in Russian)

1958 births
Living people
People from Lyubertsy
Russian rock guitarists
Russian male guitarists
Aria (band) members
Russian record producers